Hurt & the Merciless is the fourth studio album by English rock band The Heavy, released on 1 April 2016 through Counter Records and the Bad Son Recording Company. The album's first track, "Since You Been Gone", was released as the album's lead single on 4 February 2016 alongside an accompanying music video. The tracks "Turn Up" and "What Happened to the Love?" were also released as singles.

Release
Hurt & the Merciless was released on 1 April 2016 through Counter Records and the Bad Son Recording Company. It was released as a CD, a digital download, and a vinyl. A deluxe box set, limited to 1000 copies, were also released, containing both CD and vinyl copies of the album, a code containing an MP3 download of the album, badges and stickers, a poster, and two 7" vinyls, with one featuring the first two tracks on the album, "Since You Been Gone" and "What Happened to the Love?", and the other containing two bonus tracks titled "Panic Attack!" and "WTF?".

"Since You Been Gone" was released as the album's lead single on 4 February 2016, the same day the album was announced. A music video for the song was also released, directed by Focus Creeps and starring Thomas Turgoose and Abigail Hardingham. "Turn Up" was released as the album's second single on 23 February, with a lyric video being released for it, and "What Happened to the Love?" was released as the third single on 31 March, alongside a music video.

Track listing

Personnel
Personnel adapted from album liner notes.

The Heavy
 Kelvin Swaby – vocals
 Dan Taylor – guitar
 Spencer Page – bass
 Chris Ellul – drums

Other personnel
 Bazza – mastering
 Bosco Mann – arrangement, brass, strings
 Toby McLaren – arrangement, brass, strings
 Andrew Scheps – mixing

Charts

Release history

References

2016 albums
The Heavy (band) albums